Bob Robertson is a former Major League Baseball first baseman.

Bob Robertson may also refer to:

 Bob Robertson (ice hockey) (born 1927), former Canadian hockey player
 Bob Robertson (comedian), Canadian comedian
 Bob Robertson (announcer) (born 1929), retired sports announcer for Washington State University
 Bob Robertson, alias name of Sergio Leone, Italian film director
 Bob Robertson (bowls) (born 1926), England international lawn bowler